The 1986 Manitoba general election was held on March 18, 1986 to elect Members of the Legislative Assembly of the Province of Manitoba, Canada. It was won by the New Democratic Party, which took 30 seats out of 57.  The Progressive Conservative Party won 26 seats and formed the official opposition.  The Manitoba Liberal Party, which had not been represented in the previous legislature, won one seat.

Results

1 "Before" refers to standings in the Legislature at dissolution, and not to the results of the previous election. These numbers therefore reflect changes in party standings as a result of by-elections and members crossing the floor.

Riding results
Party key:

PC:  Progressive Conservative Party of Manitoba
L:  Manitoba Liberal Party
NDP:  New Democratic Party of Manitoba
P: Progressive Party of Manitoba
Comm:  Communist Party of Canada - Manitoba
Ind:  Independent
M-L: Marxist-Leninist Party of Canada - Manitoba (see by-elections)
WCC: Western Canada Concept Party of Manitoba
CoR: Confederation of Regions Party of Manitoba
Lbt: Libertarian Party of Manitoba (The Libertarian Party nominated four candidates in this election.  As the party was not officially recognized, they ran as independents.  Two of these candidates were Clancy Smith (who was probably the party's leader) and C. Dennis Owens; the other two have not yet been identified.)

Arthur:

(incumbent)Jim Downey (PC) 4569
Peter Neufeld (CoR) 1198
Steve Bobiak (NDP) 1009
Moira Bonar (L) 701

Assiniboia:

(incumbent)Ric Nordman (PC) 3813
Max Melnyk (NDP) 2195
Stan Blady (L) 1379

Brandon East:

(incumbent)Leonard Evans (NDP) 4173
Jim Armstrong (PC) 3184
Eileen McFadden (L) 535

Brandon West:

James McCrae (PC) 5537
Arnold Gambo (NDP) 4128
Kerry Auriat (L) 760

Burrows:

(incumbent)Conrad Santos (NDP) 3547
William Chornopyski (Ind) 1437
Nick Trusewych (PC) 950
Rory MacLeod (L) 587
Paula Fletcher (Comm) 131
Ted DuRussel (Ind) 36

Charleswood:

Jim Ernst (PC) 6524
Mike MacIsaac (NDP) 2826
Shari Nelson (L) 2211

Churchill:

(incumbent)Jay Cowan (NDP) 2940
Walter Menard (PC) 857
Mildred Wilke (L) 203

Dauphin:

(incumbent)John Plohman (NDP) 4886
Erv Tycholis (PC) 3121
Peter Rampton (L) 1341

Emerson:

(incumbent)Albert Driedger (PC) 4758
Ron Buzahora (NDP) 3780
Joe Antoshkiw (L) 656

Flin Flon:

(incumbent)Jerry Storie (NDP) 3316
Mary Semaniuk (PC) 1072
J. Brian King (L) 384

Fort Garry:

(incumbent)Charlie Birt (PC) 5146
Nora Losey (NDP) 3158
Ian Band (L) 2114
Ivan Merritt (WCC) 204

Fort Rouge:

(incumbent)Roland Penner (NDP) 4223
Robert Haier (PC) 2590
Lionel Ditz (L) 1683
Clancy Smith (Ind [Lbt]) 101
Nigel Hanrahan (Comm) 46

Gimli:

(incumbent)John Bucklaschuk (NDP) 4906
Ed Helwer (PC) 3955
Morley Murray (L) 649
Neil Knight (WCC) 141

Gladstone:

(incumbent)Charlotte Oleson (PC) 3402
Les Sendull (CoR) 1754
Edna Mattson (L) 879
Fred Tait (NDP) 872

Inkster:

(incumbent)Don Scott (NDP) 5480
Bayani Morcilla (PC) 1726
Eric Hope (L) 938
Lester Landry (P) 256
Lajpat Sharma (Ind) 101
Cathy Plowman (Comm) 49

Interlake:

(incumbent)Bill Uruski (NDP) 4634
Joe Schwartz (PC) 2181
Bob Lundale (L) 455
Dieter Wenzel (CoR) 289

Kirkfield Park:

(incumbent)Gerrie Hammond (PC) 5497
Cliff Hodgins (NDP) 2191
Irene Friesen (L) 1932

Lakeside:

(incumbent)Harry Enns (PC) 4303
Frieda Krpan (NDP) 2400
Hubert Good (CoR) 1052
Roger Chabot (L) 959

La Verendrye:

Helmut Pankratz (PC) 3618
Walter McDowell (NDP) 1768
Walter Hiebert (L) 734

Minnedosa:

(incumbent)Dave Blake (PC) 3316
Gary Grant (NDP) 2369
Dennis Heeney (CoR) 1508
Steve Wilson (L) 745

Niakwa:

(incumbent)Abe Kovnats (PC) 6437
Allan MacDonald (NDP) 4831
James Radford (L) 2300

Osborne:

(incumbent)Muriel Smith (NDP) 4747
Jack McGuinness (PC) 2348
Chris Sturgeon (L) 1259
Alex MacKenzie (P) 217

Pembina:

(incumbent)Don Orchard (PC) 5270
Abe Giesbrecht (CoR) 944
Edourd Hiebert (NDP) 913
Lynn Rempel (L) 849
John Brooks (P) 108

Portage la Prairie:

Ed Connery (PC) 3693
Bill Zettler (NDP) 1457
Georgina Cuthbert (CoR) 1074
Hugh Kennedy (L) 968

Rhineland:

(incumbent)Arnold Brown (PC) 3037
Albert St. Hilaire (NDP) 1549
John Kuhl (L) 1329

Riel:

Gerry Ducharme (PC) 4479
(incumbent)Doreen Dodick (NDP) 3710
Chris Sigurdson (L) 1133
Al Fostey (CoR) 187

River East:

Bonnie Mitchelson (PC) 6598
(incumbent)Phil Eyler (NDP) 5848
Robert Shelton (L) 696
Al MacDonald (CoR) 280
Katharina Cameron (WCC) 76

Roblin-Russell:

Len Derkach (PC) 3241
Fred Embryk (NDP) 3203
Garry Gaber (L) 2065

Rossmere:

(incumbent)Vic Schroeder (NDP) 4613
Harold Neufeld (PC) 4086
Cecilia Connelly (L) 1108

Rupertsland:

(incumbent)Elijah Harper (NDP) 2302
Leonard McKay (PC) 931
Ed Price (L) 577

St. James:

(incumbent)Al Mackling (NDP) 4120
Eldon Ross (PC) 3965
Tom Thompson (L) 922
Fred Debrecen (CoR) 175
Charles Lamont (P) 89
Merle Hartlin (WCC) 47

St. Johns:

Judy Wasylycia-Leis (NDP) 3753
John Baluta (PC) 1949
Joyce Popkes (L) 632
Cyril Fogel (P) 142
William Hawryluk (Ind) 115
Frank Goldspink (Comm) 65

St. Norbert:

(incumbent)Gerry Mercier (PC) 5788
Ruth Pear (NDP) 2839
Mark O’Neill (L) 2784

Ste. Rose:

Glen Cummings (PC) 3735
Garry Anderson (NDP) 3020
Rafi Mohammed (L) 952
Dave Mutch (CoR) 454

Springfield:

Gilles Roch (PC) 5094
(incumbent)Andy Anstett (NDP) 5039
Laurie Evans (L) 1376

Swan River:

Leonard Harapiak (NDP) 3773
(incumbent)Doug Gourlay (PC) 3708
Donald Washenfelder (L) 399

The Pas:

(incumbent)Harry Harapiak (NDP) 4051
Ernest Polsom (PC) 1088
Scott Gray (L) 789

Thompson:

(incumbent)Steve Ashton (NDP) 3852
Ken Biglow (PC) 1498
George Printeau (L) 433

Transcona:

(incumbent)Wilson Parasiuk (NDP) 4631
Earl Swayzie (PC) 1966
Bob Lee (L) 1200

Turtle Mountain:

Denis Rocan (PC) 3390
Gordon Kennedy (NDP) 1353
Ross McMillan (L) 1242
Bob Yake (CoR) 1150

Virden:

Glen Findlay (PC) 4251
Phil Schwarz (NDP) 1750
Alex Gabrielle (CoR) 1497
Lyman Smith (L) 524

Wolseley:

(incumbent)Myrna Phillips (NDP) 4099
John Campbell (PC) 2218
Tom Harrison (L) 1132
Sidney Green (P) 347
Donald Oliver (CoR) 115
Barry Marchand (Ind) 60

Post-election changes
Early in 1988, Laurent Desjardins announced his retirement from the legislature.  Soon after this, NDP backbencher Jim Walding voted against his party's budget, causing the government to fall.

See also
 List of Manitoba political parties
 Manitoba Liberal Party candidates, 1986 Manitoba provincial election

References

Further reading
 

1986 elections in Canada
1986
1986 in Manitoba
March 1986 events in Canada